is a railway station located in the city of Kakamigahara,  Gifu Prefecture,  Japan, operated by the private railway operator Meitetsu.

Lines

Station layout
Mikakino  Station has one ground-level island platform and one ground-level side platforms connected by a level crossing. The station is staffed.

Platforms

Adjacent stations

History
It was renamed to its present name on December 1, 1938.

Surrounding area
 Sohara Station (JR Central)
Gifu Air Field
Kawasaki Aerospace Company

See also
 List of Railway Stations in Japan

External links

  

Railway stations in Japan opened in 1926
Stations of Nagoya Railroad
Railway stations in Gifu Prefecture
Kakamigahara, Gifu